The Southeastern Louisiana Lady Lions softball team represents Southeastern Louisiana University in NCAA Division I college softball as a member of the Southland Conference. The Lions are currently led by head coach Rick Fremin. The team plays its home games at North Oak Park located on the university's campus.

Year-by-year results
Source:

National awards
NFCA Golden Shoe Award
Katie Lacour  – 2016
Jaquelyn Ramon – 2019

Roster
As of March 6, 2014.

See also
List of NCAA Division I softball programs

References

External links